Quljeed is a town in the western Awdal region of Somaliland. It is notable for being the birthplace of Dahir Riyale Kahin, the 3rd President of Somaliland.

Overview
Quljeed is situated about 30 km to the northwest of Borama.

Demographics
The town is inhabited by the Reer Dudub branch of the Jibriil Yoonis, a subclan of the Gadabuursi Dir clan.

See also
Nimmo
Gondal

Notes

References
Abasa

Archaeological sites in Somalia
Former populated places in Somalia
Cities of the Adal Sultanate